The 2021 Club de Foot Montréal season was the club's 28th season of existence, and their 10th in Major League Soccer, the top tier of the American soccer pyramid. This was the first season under the club's new name, being known as the Montreal Impact up until this point.

Due to COVID-19 cross-border restrictions imposed by the Canadian government, CF Montréal along with two other Canadian MLS teams are currently playing home matches in the United States while also sharing stadiums with other American MLS teams. The team is temporarily playing home matches at Inter Miami CF's DRV PNK Stadium since the start of the season. During the 2021 CONCACAF Gold Cup qualification, in which DRV PNK Stadium became one of the hosting stadiums for the tournament, CF Montréal also played at other MLS Stadiums where it would not cause a conflict with the Gold Cup qualifier rounds. On July 14, MLS announced that CF Montréal were allowed to play one home matches on July 17 with FC Cincinnati although they will continue to work with the Canadian Government regarding plans on future home matches. On July 23, MLS announced that CF Montréal would be allowed to play home matches in Canada for August.

Outside of the MLS, CF Montréal won their 5th Canadian Championship after defeating rival, Toronto FC 1–0.

Current squad
Source, As of September 10, 2021:

International roster slots 
Montreal currently has ten MLS International Roster Slots for use in the 2021 season. Montreal has eight slots allotted from the league and the team acquired two spots in trades with D.C. United and the Houston Dynamo.

Management

 Owner —  Joey Saputo
 President, chief executive officer —  Kevin Gilmore
 Sporting director —  Olivier Renard
 Global sporting director —  Walter Sabatini
 Assistant sporting director —  Vassili Cremanzidis
 Director of academy —  Patrick Leduc

Coaching staff

  Wilfried Nancy – head coach
  Kwame Ampadu – assistant coach
  Laurent Ciman – assistant coach
  Jason DiTullio – assistant coach
  Romuald Peiser – goalkeeping coach
  Jules Gueguen – fitness coach
  Maxime Chalier - video analyst

Player movement

In 
Per Major League Soccer and club policies terms of the deals do not get disclosed.

Out

Loans in

Loans out

Draft picks

International caps 
Players called for senior international duty during the 2021 season while under contract with the CF Montréal.

Friendlies

Review

Pre-Season 
Unless otherwise noted, all times in EST

Major League Soccer

Review

March

Tables

Eastern Conference

Overall

Results summary

Matches
Unless otherwise noted, all times in Eastern Time

Canadian Championship

Bracket

Canadian Championship results

Quarter-final

Semi-final

Final

Statistics

Appearances, Minutes Played, and Goals Scored

Top scorers

{| class="wikitable sortable alternance"  style="font-size:85%; text-align:center; line-height:14px; width:85%;"
|-
!width=10|Rank
!width=10|Nat.
! scope="col" style="width:275px;"|Player
!width=10|Pos.
!width=80|MLS
!width=80|Canadian Championship
!width=80|TOTAL
|-
|1||  || Romell Quioto                              || FW ||8 ||1 || 9
|-
|2||  || Mason Toye                                 || FW ||7 ||  || 7
|-
|3||  || Djordje Mihailovic                         || MF ||4 ||  || 4
|-
|3||  || Joaquín Torres || FW ||4 ||  || 4
|-
|3||  || Sunusi Ibrahim                         || FW ||4 ||  || 4
|-
|6||  || Rudy Camacho                               || DF ||3 ||  || 3
|-
|7||  || Bjorn Johnsen                              || FW ||2 ||  || 2
|-
|7||  || Ahmed Hamdy     || MF ||2 ||  || 2
|-
|7||  || Zachary Brault-Guillard                    || DF ||2 ||  || 2
|-
|7||  || Victor Wanyama                             || MF ||2 ||  || 2
|-
|7||  || Mathieu Choinière                          || MF ||2 ||  || 2
|-
|7||  || Matko Miljevic                             || MF ||1 ||1 || 2
|-
|7||   || Ballou Tabla                              || MF ||  ||2 || 2
|-
|14||  || Samuel Piette                             || MF ||1 ||  || 1
|-
|14||  || Kamal Miller                              || DF ||1 ||  || 1
|-
|14||  || Aljaž Struna                              || DF ||1 ||  || 1
|-
|14||  || Lassi Lappalainen                         || FW ||1 ||  || 1
|-
|- class="sortbottom"
| colspan="4"|Totals|| 45 || 4  ||49

Italic: denotes player left the club during the season.

Top Assists 

{| class="wikitable sortable alternance"  style="font-size:85%; text-align:center; line-height:14px; width:85%;"
|-
!width=10|Rank
!width=10|Nat.
! scope="col" style="width:275px;"|Player
!width=10|Pos.
!width=80|MLS
!width=80|Canadian Championship
!width=80|TOTAL
|-
|1||  || Djordje Mihailovic                           || MF ||16||  || 16
|-
|2||  || Romell Quioto                                || FW ||6 ||  || 6
|-
|3||  || Joaquín Torres   || FW ||5 ||  || 5
|-
|4||  || Zachary Brault-Guillard                      || DF ||3 ||1 || 4
|-
|5||  || Kamal Miller                                 || DF ||3 ||  || 3
|-
|5||  || Joel Waterman                                || DF ||3 ||  || 3
|-
|5||  || Lassi Lappalainen                            || FW ||2 ||1 || 3
|-
|8||  || Samuel Piette                                || MF ||2 ||  || 2
|-
|8||  || Mustafa Kizza                                || DF ||2 ||  || 2
|-
|8||  || Zorhan Bassong                               || DF ||1 ||1 || 2
|-
|11||  || Victor Wanyama                              || MF ||1 ||  || 1
|-
|11||  || Rudy Camacho                                || DF ||  ||1 || 1
|-
|11||  || Erik Hurtado                            || FW ||1 ||  || 1
|-
|- class="sortbottom"
| colspan="4"|Totals|| 45 || 4 ||49

Italic: denotes player left the club during the season.

Goals Against Average 

{| class="wikitable" style="font-size: 95%; text-align: center;"
|-
! rowspan="2" style="width:1%"|No.
! rowspan="2" style="width:90px"|Nat.
! rowspan="2" style="width:25%"|Player
! colspan="3" |Total
! colspan="3" |Major League Soccer
! colspan="3" |Canadian Championship
|-
!MIN!!GA!!GAA!! MIN!!GA!!GAA!! MIN!!GA!!GAA
|-
| 1
|
| style="text-align: left;" |Sebastian Breza
|990
|9
|0.82
|720
|8
|1.00
|270
|1
|0.33
|-
|23
|
| style="text-align: left;" |Clément Diop
|720
|9
|1.13
|720
|9
|1.13
|0
|0
|0.00
|-
|41
|
| style="text-align: left;" |James Pantemis
|1620
|27
|1.50
|1620
|27
|1.50
|0
|0
|0.00

Italic: denotes player left the club during the season.

Clean sheets 

{| class="wikitable sortable alternance"  style="font-size:85%; text-align:center; line-height:14px; width:85%;"
|-
!width=10|No.
!width=10|Nat.
! scope="col" style="width:225px;"|Player
!width=80|MLS
!width=80|Canadian Championship
!width=80|TOTAL
|-
|41||  || James Pantemis                || 3 ||    ||3
|-
|23||  || Clément Diop              || 3 ||    ||3
|-
|1||   || Sebastian Breza               || 2 ||  2 ||4
|-
|- class="sortbottom"
| colspan="3"|Totals|| 8 || 2  || 10

Italic: denotes player left the club during the season.

Top minutes played 

{| class="wikitable sortable alternance"  style="font-size:85%; text-align:center; line-height:14px; width:80%;"
|-
!width=10|No.
!width=10|Nat.
!scope="col" style="width:275px;"|Player
!width=10|Pos.
!width=80|MLS
!width=80|Canadian Championship
!width=80|TOTAL
|-
|4 ||  || Rudy Camacho                                || DF || 2746 || 196|| 2942
|-
|8 ||  || Djordje Mihailovic                          || MF || 2805 ||  90|| 2895
|-
|3||   || Kamal Miller                                || DF || 2377 ||  90|| 2467
|-
|2 ||  || Victor Wanyama                              || MF || 2365 ||  90|| 2455
|-
|15||  || Zachary Brault-Guillard                     || DF || 2056 || 142|| 2198
|-
|16||  || Joel Waterman                               || DF || 1854 || 270|| 2124
|-
|29||  || |Mathieu Choinière                          || MF || 1992 ||  90|| 2082
|-
|18||  || Joaquín Torres  || FW || 1891 ||  73|| 1964
|-
|6 ||  || Samuel Piette                               || MF || 1714 || 192|| 1906
|-
|41||  || James Pantemis                              || GK || 1620 ||    || 1620
|-

Italic: denotes player left the club during the season.

Yellow and red cards

Recognition

MLS team of the Week

Notes

References 

CF Montréal seasons
Montreal Impact
Montreal Impact
Montreal Impact